The Manson Family is a 1997 American true crime exploitation horror film directed by Jim Van Bebber. The film covers the lives of Charles Manson and his family of followers.

Plot
In 1996, Jack Wilson is producing a crime docuseries segment on the Manson Family murders. Narrated via contemporaneous interviews and flashbacks, several former members of Charles "Charlie" Manson's "family" recount their time spent leading up to the August 1969 murder spree. Tex Watson is brought to Spahn Ranch, a former movie set-turned-commune where Manson is housing his followers. Tex ingratiates himself with the group, who spend their time taking copious amounts of LSD, smoking marijuana, and engaging in group sex; meanwhile, Charlie unsuccessfully attempts to get a record deal with his folk music.

Several of the male members, including Tex and Bobby Beausoleil, attempt to recruit Simi, a young woman, into the family. They convince her to take LSD before the entire family gang rapes her at Charlie's command. The group begin breaking into random homes in Los Angeles, stealing items and rearranging furniture while the occupants sleep. Later, during a dispute over a drug transaction, Charlie shoots and kills Lotsapoppa, an African American drug dealer whom he suspects is part of the Black Panthers.

The whole family engage in a mass ritualistic orgy in which they sacrifice a puppy. After, Tex informs follower Patricia Krenwinkel and several others that he is afraid of Charlie and wants to leave. Meanwhile, Bobby and Susan Atkins confront an acquaintance, music teacher Gary Hinman, at his home, planning to raid his house of money, as they believe him to be wealthy. When the plan goes unsuccessfully, Gary is held hostage for two days before Charlie arrives and slices his ear off. After Charlie leaves, Susan attempts to nurse Gary back to health, but she and Bobby find themselves unsure how to carry out the robbery, as Gary does not have money. As a last resort, Bobby stabs him in the chest, after which he and Susan smother him with a cushion. Susan writes the phrase "political piggy" on the wall in Gary's blood before they depart. Bobby is arrested days later while trying to flee town.

Under Charlie's instruction, Tex, Susan, and Patricia Krenwinkel, and Linda Kasabian depart on the evening of August 8 to break into houses in Los Angeles, and are told to "bring knives." They arrive at a home on Cielo Drive, where Tex shoots Steven Parent, a man sitting in his parked car, near the gate. They enter the home and bind its residents, including Sharon Tate, Jay Sebring, Abigail Folger, and Voytek Frykowski. Tex shoots Jay before stabbing him to death. Tex shoots Voytek as he tries to flee before bludgeoning him with the pistol while the sheepish Linda watches in horror. Susan proceeds to attack Abigail in the kitchen, stabbing her before Tex slashes her throat. Abigail, clinging to life, stumbles outside before collapsing in the lawn. Meanwhile, the pregnant Sharon is brutally stabbed to death in the living room.

The next night, the four members, in addition to Leslie Van Houten and Steve Grogan, viciously murder Leno and Rosemary LaBianca in their home. Two weeks later, several members murder Donald Shea at Charlie's instruction, as he fears Donald knows too much and could provide authorities information in the Tate-LaBianca murders. Later, the family members, including Charlie, are arrested and indicted on the murders. From jail, Manson accrues a cult following of young people who speak out in his support to the media. Whilst watching a segment of the docuseries one night, Wilson is murdered by a group of youths in a style likely inspired by the Manson Family.

Cast

Production
Despite support from various people, including members of the band Skinny Puppy, who provided a musical score (in the form of Download's Charlie's Family album), the film remained incomplete. A rough cut version screened at a number of festivals during 1997, including at the Fantasia Film Festival in July of that year.

Classification
Despite not being banned in any country in the world, it is classified harshly in almost all countries of the world due to its graphic violence and sexuality.

Release
The film was released in a now out-of-print combination Blu-ray and DVD set in 2003 by Severin Films.

Reception
On Rotten Tomatoes, the film has an approval rating of 69% based on reviews from 32 critics. On Metacritic, the film has a score of 56 out of 100 based on reviews from 17 critics, indicating "mixed or average reviews".

Notes

See also
 Counterculture of the 1960s
 Exploitation film
 Extreme cinema

References

External links
 
 
 
 

1997 crime drama films
1997 crime thriller films
1990s rediscovered films
1997 drama films
1997 films
1997 horror films
American crime drama films
American crime thriller films
American horror thriller films
American independent films
American serial killer films
Biographical films about serial killers
Crime films based on actual events
Crime horror films
Cultural depictions of Charles Manson
1990s English-language films
Films about hallucinogens
Films set in the 1960s
Films set in the 1970s
Films set in the 1990s
Films shot in Ohio
Horror films based on actual events
Rediscovered American films
American exploitation films
American splatter films
1990s American films